Due to the success of Space Jam in 1996, Warner Bros.' Looney Tunes were revamped as a series with the release of multiple new expansions of the canon including movies, theatrical shorts, and television series.

Roots of the revival (1979–1996)
After 10 years of absence from the silver screen, the Looney Tunes returned in the compilation film The Bugs Bunny/Road Runner Movie, (Chuck Jones, 1979), later other compilation movies followed suit, in 1987 new shorts were made (continuing production intermittently through 2010) and beginning in 1990, original television series. Owing to the success of these films Warner Bros. produced Space Jam (1996), whose success positively reintroduced the Looney Tunes on film. In 1994 Erik Dehkhoda created and directed the "3D Looney Tunes" Project at Warner Bros. All of the main characters were successfully converted into Digital 3D Models. Erik was mentored by Chuck Jones, 'who admittedly wanted nothing to do with computers at the time', and the Looney Tunes were introduced in a new form for the CGI revolution taking place. This new technology generated a lot of Press for Warner Bros and the Looney Tunes due to the fact that they were introduced nearly two years before Disney's Toy Story was released.

After "Space Jam" (1997–2003)
In 2000, Time Warner granted all US television rights to Cartoon Network, ending ABC's The Bugs Bunny Show and Nickelodeon's Looney Tunes Show. Three years later, Warner Home Video began to release Looney Tunes Golden Collection box sets with uncut and remastered cartoons (some with their original titles), which continued on yearly releases until 2008, when WHV axed all the classic cartoon collections as a result of the 2008 financial crisis.

Looney Tunes: Back in Action
Looney Tunes: Back in Action began production in 1998 as Spy Jam, a title inspired by Space Jam. The film was beset with troubles during early production, as the unsuccessful releases of some animated movies were overshadowed by CGI-focused studios like Pixar and DreamWorks. The withdrawal of Jackie Chan (the film's original star) caused the film to be postponed several times.

Originally it was planned to open in the summer of 2003, but the big success of Finding Nemo (made by the rival studio, Disney-Pixar) forced the studio to move the release date one more time, now for the Thanksgiving holiday season. The release date proved fatal to the film's box office performance. It was sandwiched between the releases of Elf and The Cat in the Hat. It was released the same month as The Matrix Revolutions, another Warner Bros. film that the studio advertised heavily. 

Promotion of the film was limited to advertising with the film's promotional partners, a few television ads, and the release of very little merchandise directly based on the film. Although it received better reviews than Space Jam, the movie's box office performance was poor.) As a result of this, Warner Bros. Animation faced a huge reorganization and is now mostly focused on television and direct-to-video feature films. There were plans to make theatrical shorts with Looney Tunes and Tom & Jerry, but the plans fell through due to Back in Action's commercial failure. Some shorts were already completed when this decision was made, so they were released directly to home video.

Reorganization and a new start (2004–present)
Now exclusively working on the small screen, Warner Bros. Animation produced three Looney Tunes television shows; Baby Looney Tunes, Duck Dodgers, and Loonatics Unleashed, the latter one being the most successful, (despite the constant criticisms owing to its departure from the classic designs).  At the same time, the original shorts were taken off Cartoon Network due to an extreme lack of corporate synergy between CN's parents, Turner and Warner Bros (as in WB wanted Turner to pay them a royalty for the rights to air the classic shorts and Turner refused).  Within the past few years, people have also started to find the internet, Xbox Live and DVDs useful for watching these shorts, meaning viewers still had access to the classic shorts no matter what.

More recently, the Looney Tunes are having a new lease on life, with three 3D Wile E. Coyote and Road Runner shorts released in many countries preceding family feature films, beginning July 30, 2010 (with the possibility of releasing more shorts with other characters), one all-new series in the style of the original shorts, which premiered on May 3, 2011, and two probable CGI/live-action feature films, one starring Marvin the Martian and one starring Speedy Gonzales, with pre-production from the former slated to begin at the end of 2011. Furthermore, Cartoon Network brought back the original shorts in March 2011 for its kid-targeted audience to be re-familiarized with the characters for The Looney Tunes Show, which seems to have proven effective given that it is still airing as of August 2012.

On June 8, 2011, Warner Bros. Animation announced that there will be more Looney Tunes 3-D theatrical shorts; the first was "I Tawt I Taw A Putty Tat" with Tweety Bird and Sylvester, that preceded the film Happy Feet 2.

On September 19, 2012, it was announced that a new Looney Tunes reboot film was in development. Former Saturday Night Live cast member Jenny Slate was already on board as writer for the new flick. Jeffrey Clifford, Harry Potter producer David Heyman and Dark Shadows writers David Katzenberg and Seth Grahame-Smith were slated to produce the film.

See also
 Warner Bros. Animation
 Looney Tunes
 Merrie Melodies
 Looney Tunes and Merrie Melodies filmography (1970–present and miscellaneous)
 Looney Tunes Golden Collection
 Looney Tunes Super Stars
 Duck Dodgers
 Baby Looney Tunes
 Space Jam
 Looney Tunes: Back in Action
 Taz-Mania
 The Looney Tunes Show
 WarnerMedia

References